The Charter Oak was an unusually large white oak tree growing on Wyllys Hyll in Hartford, Connecticut in the United States, from around the 12th or 13th century until it fell during a storm in 1856. According to tradition, Connecticut's Royal Charter of 1662 was hidden within the hollow of the tree to thwart its confiscation by the English governor-general. The oak became a symbol of American independence and is commemorated on the Connecticut State Quarter. In 1935, for Connecticut's tercentennial, it was also depicted on both a commemorative half dollar and a postage stamp.

Early history

Dutch explorer Adrian Block described a tree at the future site of Hartford in his log in 1614 which is understood to be this one. In the 1630s, a delegation of local Native Americans is said to have approached Samuel Wyllys, the early settler who owned and cleared much of the land around it, encouraging its preservation and describing it as planted ceremonially, for the sake of peace, when their tribe first settled in the area.

Incident
The name "Charter Oak" stems from the local legend in which a cavity within the tree was used in late 1687 as a hiding place for the Charter of 1662.

This much regarding the charter is history:
King Charles II granted the Connecticut Colony an unusual degree of autonomy in 1662.
His successor James II consolidated several colonies into the Dominion of New England in 1686, in part to take firmer control of them.
He appointed Sir Edmund Andros as governor-general over it, who stated that his appointment had invalidated the charters of the various constituent colonies. He went to each colony to collect their charters, presumably seeing symbolic value in physically reclaiming the documents.
Andros arrived in Hartford late in October 1687, where his mission was at least as unwelcome as it had been in the other colonies.

According to the dominant tradition, the incident took place on 31 October 1687  in the upper room at Zachariah Sanford's tavern, Andros demanded the document and it was produced, but the candlelights were suddenly doused during ensuing discussion. The parchment was spirited out a window and thence to the Oak by Captain Joseph Wadsworth, ancestor of Elijah Wadsworth.

In 1900, it was suggested that a copy was surreptitiously substituted for the original in June 1687 and the original secreted in the oak lest Andros find it in any search of buildings.

The Museum of Connecticut History (a subdivision of the Connecticut State Library) credits the idea that Andros never got the original charter, and displays a parchment that it regards as the original. (The Connecticut Historical Society is said to possess a "fragment" of it.)

Andros was overthrown in Boston two years later in the 1689 Boston revolt. The Dominion of New England was then dissolved.

Relics

The oak was blown down by a violent, tempestuous storm on August 21, 1856 and timber from it was made into a number of chairs now displayed in the Hartford Capitol Building. The desk of the Governor of Connecticut and the chairs for the Speaker of the House of Representatives and President of the Senate in the state capitol were made from wood salvaged from the Charter Oak. Another chair was made by noted painter Frederic Church, a native of Hartford, and is still on display at his former home.

A wooden baseball made from the Charter Oak was presented by the Charter Oak Engine Co. No. 1 on September 20, 1860 to the Charter Oak Base Ball Club of Brooklyn.

A cane made from a branch of the Charter Oak was presented to President Andrew Johnson by supporters in January 1868, as impeachment proceedings were underway.

In 1868, Mark Twain wrote of a trip he took to Hartford and mused on the pride his guide showed in the uses to which the Charter Oak had been used:
Anything that is made of its wood is deeply venerated by the inhabitants, and is regarded as very precious. I went all about the town with a citizen whose ancestors came over with the Pilgrims in the Quaker City -- in the Mayflower, I should say -- and he showed me all the historic relics of Hartford. He showed me a beautiful carved chair in the Senate Chamber, where the bewigged and awfully homely old-time Governors of the Commonwealth frown from their canvasse overhead. "Made from Charter Oak," he said. I gazed upon it with inexpressible solicitude. He showed me another carved chair in the House, "Charter Oak," he said. I gazed again with interest. Then we looked at the rusty, stained and famous old Charter, and presently I turned to move away. But he solemnly drew me back and pointed to the frame. "Charter Oak," said he. I worshipped. We went down to Wadsworth's Atheneum, and I wanted to look at the pictures, but he conveyed me silently to a corner and pointed to a log, rudely shaped somewhat like a chair, and whispered, "Charter Oak." I exhibited the accustomed reverence. He showed me a walking stick, a needlecase, a dog-collar, a three-legged stool, a boot-jack, a diner-table, a ten-pen alley, a tooth-pick, a ----

I interrupted him and said, "Never mind -- we'll bunch the whole lumber year, and call it ---"

"Charter Oak," he said.

"Well," I said, "now let us go and see some Charter Oak, for a change."

I meant that for a joke. But how was he to know that, being a stranger? He took me around and showed me Charter Oak enough to build a plank road from here to Great Salt Lake City.

In literature
Lydia Sigourney published her poem on this tree,  in her 1827 collection of poetry. She remarks that this poem was occasioned by the death of the last proprietor, of the name of Wyllys, in whose family this estate had remained since the first settlement of the country.

See also
 List of individual trees

References
Notes

Bibliography
Excerpt from Our Country, vol. I, late 19th century
Connecticut Colony Charter of 1662

External links

History of Hartford, Connecticut
Pre-statehood history of Connecticut
Dominion of New England
Individual oak trees
Symbols of Connecticut
1850s individual tree deaths
Individual trees in Connecticut